This is a timeline of optical character recognition.

Overview

Timeline

See also 
 Optical character recognition
 Handwriting recognition

References

Optical character recognition
Computing timelines